Næsby Boldklub is a Danish football club currently playing in the Danish 3rd Division, the fourth tier of Danish football. They play at ALPI Arena Næsby in Kirkendrup, Odense N. Their home ground has a capacity of 2,500.

History

Early years 
Næsby Boldklub was founded in 1938. In the first year of the club's existence, it played its home matches at Højløkke Allé: a highly questionable pitch which was therefore given the unfavourable nickname Grusgraven ("the gravel pit"). In 1950, Næsby Boldklub moved to a ground on Søren Eriksensvej, and in 1968 a new clubhouse was inaugurated which replace the so-called German barracks left behind following World War II. Since 1984, the club has been located on Stærehusvej in the Odense suburb of Kirkendrup.

In 1951, Næsby Boldklub promoted to Series 1, the sixth tier of Danish football. Five years later, the club reached promotion to the Funen Series, the highest division for men organised by the regional football association DBU Funen (DBUF) and then one of the fifth-highest divisions overall in the Danish football league system. By 1966, Næsby had reached the Denmark Series, the fourth level.

Næsby first reached national attention in 1969 when they reached the Round of 16 of the Danish Cup. About 14 years later – in 1983 – Næsby secured, via a 2–1 win over Vordingborg IF, promotion to the Danish 3rd Division. Many of the players who reached the historical promotion had played for the youth team of Næsby, which had reached the national finals for youth teams in 1977. The club moved to its current home, Næsby Stadium at Stærehusvej in 1984 after it had achieved promotion to the Danish 3rd Division the year before.

Recent years 
Today, Næsby Boldklub has established itself as a divisional club. On 26 October 2011, Næsby reached its largest success when they beat Danish Superliga club Silkeborg IF 4–3 at home in the cup with Christian Jensen scoring the winner five minutes before the final whistle. Their cup run that year, however, ended in the following round when Næsby lost 5–1 at home to SønderjyskE. The club's best result in the Danish 2nd Division, the third tier of Danish football, occurred in the 2011–12 season, when Næsby ended in second place of the league table, surpassed only by the former Funen merger project, FC Fyn.

References

External links
 Official site

 
Football clubs in Denmark
1938 establishments in Denmark
Association football clubs established in 1938